Ronald Paul Herzog (April 22, 1942 – April 12, 2019) was an American prelate of the Roman Catholic Church, who served as Bishop of Alexandria in central Louisiana from 2005 to 2017.

Biography
He was born in Akron, Ohio. A child of a marriage of mixed faiths, his parents were a Lutheran and a Catholic. He studied at St. Joseph Seminary in Covington, Louisiana, and at the Pontifical College Josephinum in Worthington, Ohio. He was ordained to the priesthood on June 1, 1968.

He did pastoral work in the Diocese of Natchez-Jackson, Mississippi, but was later incardinated into the Diocese of Biloxi on March 1, 1977 and served as pastor of Our Lady of Perpetual Help in Lumberton, Mississippi, and the Saint Joseph Church and Mission in Poplarville, Mississippi. Herzog was director of the diocesan Office of Liturgy from 1980 to 1985. He was later raised to the rank of monsignor, and became pastor of Immaculate Conception Church in Laurel in 1988. He also served as chaplain of the National Guard, holding the rank of brigadier general.

On November 4, 2004, Herzog was appointed Bishop of Alexandria, Louisiana, by Pope John Paul II. He received his episcopal consecration on January 5, 2005, from Archbishop Alfred Hughes, with Bishops Thomas Rodi and Robert Muench serving as co-consecrators. He selected as his episcopal motto, "One In The Lord."

On September 21, 2016, Pope Francis named David Talley, auxiliary bishop of Atlanta, as Bishop Coadjutor of Alexandria,. Herzog retired and Talley succeeded him as Bishop of Alexandria on February 2, 2017.

He was the Catholic Chairman of the Anglican-Roman Catholic Consultation. Within the United States Conference of Catholic Bishops, he was a member of the Committee on Divine Worship, Committee on National Collections, and the Subcommittee on Native American Catholics.

See also
 

 Catholic Church hierarchy
 Catholic Church in the United States
 Historical list of the Catholic bishops of the United States
 List of Catholic bishops of the United States
 Lists of patriarchs, archbishops, and bishops

References

External links
 Roman Catholic Diocese of Alexandria Official Site
United States Conference of Catholic Bishops

Episcopal succession

1942 births
2019 deaths
Roman Catholic bishops of Alexandria
People from Akron, Ohio
Pontifical College Josephinum alumni
Religious leaders from Ohio
20th-century Roman Catholic bishops in the United States
21st-century Roman Catholic bishops in the United States
Catholics from Ohio
Ohio National Guard personnel